To Welcome the Fade is the fourth full-length studio album released by the American death-doom band Novembers Doom in 2002. It was re-issued in 2004 by The End Records with a second CD containing the EP For Every Leaf that Falls as well as live versions of "Lost in a Day" and "Not the Strong" and a live bootleg video for "Within My Flesh".

Track listing

Personnel
 Paul Kuhr - vocals, artwork, layout
 Joe Nunez - drums
 Larry Roberts - guitars
 Eric Wayne Burnley - guitars, keyboards

Additional personnel and staff
 Neil Kernon - additional solo guitar on "Dark Fields for Brilliance", keyboards on "If Forever", producer, recording, mixing
 Nora O'Conner - female vocals
 Brian Gordon - bass
 Ramón Bretón - mastering
 Justin Leeah - engineering
 Travis Smith - artwork

References 

2002 albums
Novembers Doom albums
Albums produced by Neil Kernon
Albums with cover art by Travis Smith (artist)